Diane Terri Finegood is an American–Canadian kinesiologist, chemical and biomedical engineer, and physiologist. Finegood was elected a Fellow of the Canadian Academy of Health Sciences in 2007.

Early life and education
Finegood completed her bachelor's degree in Chemical Engineering from the University of Michigan and her master's degree in Biomedical Engineering from Northwestern University. Following this, she obtained her PhD in Physiology and Biophysics from the University of Southern California in 1984.

Career
From 1984 to 1986, Finegood was a postdoctoral fellow in the laboratory of Mladen Vranic at the University of Toronto. From 1987 to 1996, Finegood was on faculty at the University of Alberta where she continued her basic science research on diabetes and metabolic physiology and began work with the islet transplant group on a  basic science research program. In 1996, Finegood moved from the University of Alberta to Simon Fraser University where her research expanded from the pathophysiology of type 2 diabetes to include work on type 1 diabetes. A few years later, her research team received one of two Juvenile Diabetes Foundation/Medical Research Council Diabetes Research Partnership grants. With this funding, Finegood began investigating the earliest stages of the immune system's attack on insulin-making beta cells in those with type 1 diabetes.

Finegood has received many honours and awards throughout her career. In 1995, Finegood received Diabetes Canada's Young Scientist Award for the purpose of encouraging "outstanding research conducted in Canada by young scientists in the field of diabetes.". In 2001, she was recognized with the B.C. Sugar Achievement award as someone who has "brought distinction to the university and B.C. by achieving national and international recognition." and in 2002 a Woman of Distinction award "for her ground-breaking diabetes research on the onset of juvenile and adult diabetes." Finegood was later recognized as a Trailblazer & Trendsetter in the 2006 Top 100 Canada's Most Powerful Women. In 2007, she was elected a Fellow of the Canadian Academy of Health Sciences. She also received the 2008 Frederick G. Banting Award from Diabetes Canada for her contributions to obesity and diabetes.

In 2000, Finegood was appointed as the inaugural scientific Director of the CIHR Institute if Nutrition, Metabolism and Diabetes.  In this role, Finegood began directing research funds towards the obesity epidemic. Her focus on obesity led her to establish a novel public-private collaboration called Canada on the Move with Kellogg Canada. During her time as scientific director, she evolved her academic pursuits towards public-private partnership, systems thinking. and complexity.  She stepped down as scientific director in 2008 after serving in the role for eight years.

In 2011, Finegood was appointed president and CEO of the Michael Smith Foundation for Health Research where she was responsible for raising $140 million in funding from the provincial government and led the development of a provincial health research strategy.  In 2017, she returned to the Simon Fraser University where she is a Professor and Fellow in the Morris J. Wosk Centre for Dialogue.  She continues to work on systems approaches to complex challenges, serves on a number of scientific advisory boards, and is applying dialogue approaches to public engagement on a national framework for diabetes.

References

External links

Living people
Academic staff of Simon Fraser University
University of Michigan alumni
Northwestern University alumni
University of Southern California alumni
American chemical engineers
Canadian chemical engineers
Fellows of the Canadian Academy of Health Sciences
Year of birth missing (living people)